Tabatha Takes Over (formerly Tabatha's Salon Takeover) is an American reality television series on the Bravo network, in which former Shear Genius contestant and hair salon owner, Tabatha Coffey helps failing salons turn around in one week. The series premiered on August 21, 2008 and is produced by Reveille Productions, a division of Shine Group.

In March 2011, Bravo announced that the fourth season of the series would be renamed Tabatha Takes Over and the premise would be expanded beyond just hair salons to include Coffey "taking over" various other small businesses and family enterprises. Season 4 premiered on Tuesday, January 10, 2012, with the final episode of the season airing on April 3, 2012. Tabatha Takes Over was renewed for Season 5 in December 2012. Season 5 premiered on April 4, 2013.

Format
Tabatha Takes Over begins with Tabatha meeting the owner(s) of the business that she will take over; in Seasons 1 through 3, these were exclusively hair salons, but in Season 4, other struggling small business are featured (including a gay bar, a frozen yogurt parlor, and a dog grooming/doggie day care facility). During a discussion regarding the state of the business, Tabatha and the owner(s) watch surveillance tapes that invariably reveal poor management, unprofessional staff behavior, and uncomfortable/dissatisfied clientele; Tabatha demands the keys to the business and the takeover begins. Tabatha enters the business with the owner(s), informing the staff that she will take over and calls them out on what she has seen; she informs them that some staff could be in danger of losing their jobs. She then requests a tour ("The Inspection"), usually finding it dirty, unsanitary, and unorganized. She calls a staff meeting for the following day, during which she gets their point of view. After the staff meeting she brings in clients so she can assess the staff's work ("The Assessment"). By the end of the second day, she sits down with the owner and talks about what she thinks should be changed. The third day usually consists of team building or marketing the business and the beginning of the renovation. The renovation takes about 3 days. By the last day, "The Reopening" happens, where the salon starts anew and Tabatha assesses their improvements in a week. By the end of the day, she gives her "Final Recommendations" to the owner(s), announces to the staff the decisions of the owner(s) and gives the key back to the owner. After a few weeks, Tabatha comes back to see how/if the business has changed.

Episodes

See also
 The Hotel Inspector
 Mary Queen of Shops
 Ramsay's Kitchen Nightmares
 Bar Rescue

References

External links
 Tabatha Takes Over at BravoTV.com
 Tabatha's Salon Takeover at BravoTV.com

2000s American reality television series
2010s American reality television series
2008 American television series debuts
2013 American television series endings
Fashion-themed reality television series
English-language television shows
Television series by Reveille Productions
Bravo (American TV network) original programming